Tupitsyno may refer to:
Tupitsyno, Mezhdurechensky District, Vologda Oblast
Tupitsyno, Sokolsky District, Vologda Oblast
 Tupitsyno, Vozhegodsky District, Vologda Oblast